Khirbet Safa is a Palestinian village located twelve kilometers north-west of Hebron.The village is in the Hebron Governorate Southern West Bank. According to the Palestinian Central Bureau of Statistics, the village had a population of 1,105 in mid-year 2006.

History
In 1883 the PEF's Survey of Western Palestine described it as "a small village, with a well to the north, on the west slope just below the watershed."

Footnotes

Bibliography

External links
Welcome To Kh. Safa
Survey of Western Palestine, Map 21:    IAA, Wikimedia commons 

Villages in the West Bank
Hebron Governorate
Municipalities of the State of Palestine